Makhinsky is a rural locality (a settlement) in Posyolok Dobryatino, Gus-Khrustalny District, Vladimir Oblast, Russia. The population was 19 as of 2010.

Geography 
Makhinsky is located 64 km east of Gus-Khrustalny (the district's administrative centre) by road. Dobryatino is the nearest rural locality.

References 

Rural localities in Gus-Khrustalny District